Salur, Salyr or Salgur were an ancient Oghuz Turkic people and a sub-branch of the Üçok tribal federation. The medieval Karamanid principality in Anatolia belonged to the Karaman branch of the Salur. The Salghurids of Fars (Atabegs of Fars), were a dynasty of Turkoman Salur origin. The patriarchs of the modern Turkmen tribe of Salyr in Turkmenistan, Uzbekistan, Afghanistan, Iraq and Iran, as well as the Salar nationality in China claim descent from the Salur.

Etymology

Historian and statesman of the Ilkhanate, Rashid al-Din Hamadani in his work Oghuzname, which is part of his extensive history book Jami' al-tawarikh (Compendium of Chronicles), says that the name Salyr means “wherever you go, you fight with a sword and a club”, and in the book of the khan and historian of the Khanate of Khiva  Abu al-Ghazi Bahadur, Shajara-i Tarākima (Genealogy of the Turkmens), the meaning of the tribe's name is given as “armed with a saber”.

History

According to various versions of the Oghuz-Turkic heroic epos Oghuzname, the Salyr tribe played an important role in the Oghuz Yabgu State up to the middle of the 10th century until the beginning of the Seljuk movement, and many Khans of this State were from the Salyrs. Rashid al-Din Hamadani:

Subsequently, the bulk of the Salyr tribe lived on the territory of Turkmenistan, a significant part of them in the 11th-12th centuries left along with other Oghuz-Turkmen tribes to the west; in Asia Minor they established the Salghurids State centered in Iraq in the 12th century, and supported other Turkmen beyliks in the reconstruction of Anatolia. The Salgurid Dynasty, which ruled in Fars in 1148-1282 and played an important role in the creation of the Sultanate of Rum, belonged to the Salyr tribe. Part of the tribe moved to Crimea, and the Crimean river Salgir, according to some scholars, owes its name to this tribe. In the 14th-16th centuries, the Salyr led the largest military-tribal association of five Turkmen tribes: Salyr, Arsary, Tekke, Yomud and Saryk. This military alliance existed until the waters of the Amu Darya stopped flowing along Uzboy watercourse. The Salyrs of Khorasan were known in the southern Turkmenistan. In the 16th-19th centuries, the Salyr Turkmen tribe lived in Mangyshlak peninsula and the area of Northern Balkan mountains of Turkmenistan, then in the Khiva Khanate, later in the middle reaches of the Amu Darya river, in the Murghab oasis and, finally, in Serakhs - the last place of their final settlement in 1884.

Salur Kazan, one of the heroes in Dede Korkut's epic tales, is also a Salurian. Some Salurs still live in the Middle East and Central Asia.

See also
 Oghuz traditional tribal organization
Chepni, another Üçok tribe.

Notes

References

Salur tribe